The Sloughi , or Arabian Greyhound (Arabic: سلوقي), is an ancient breed of domesticated dog, specifically a member of the sighthound family. It originates from North Africa and is found in Algeria, Tunisia, Morocco and Libya.

History

The Sloughi has existed for centuries in North Africa, primarily in Algeria, Morocco and Tunisia, but also into parts of Western Sahara, Mali, Libya and Egypt. The word sloughi is likely a Berber pronunciation of the Arabic saluki, the similarly-looking and -behaving Arabian sighthound; the two breeds likely share a common ancestor. Algerian Neolithic rock paintings, plus tomb paintings and hieroglyphics in Egypt, have been discovered portraying distinctly slender dogs with drooped ears, hinting at the breed's earlier origins.  Sloughis are still used for hunting in North African countries, as well as being  a reliable familial guard dog. The Sloughi was accepted into the FCI in 1998, receiving recognition by the American Kennel Club as recently as January 1, 2016, and being able to compete in the AKC Hound Group.

Appearance
Despite their similar looks, the Sloughi should not to be confused with the smoother-coated Saluki, nor to be confused with the long-coated Afghan Hound. The Sloughi is a medium-sized, short-haired (smooth-coated), active sighthound developed by the Berbers of North Africa (in the area including Algeria, Morocco, Tunisia, and Libya) to hunt game such as hare, fox, jackal, gazelle, antelope, sand grouse, and other smaller- to medium-sized animals. It is an ancient breed, treasured in North Africa for its hunting skills, speed, agility, and endurance over long distances. It is a robust, but elegant and racy, sighthound with evenly proportioned limbs, back and tail. Nonetheless, Sloughi are not bred to be fragile dogs. Their overall attitude is noble and somewhat aloof, but with a regal air of class; the expression of the dark eyes is gentle and melancholy. In regions where they are still used as sighthounds, their appearance can vary from region to region based on breeding stocks, and environmental conditions.

The Sloughi's head is long and elegant with droopy ears. The body and legs show defined bony structure and strong, lean muscles. The skeletal structure is sturdy. The topline is essentially horizontal blending into a bony, gently sloping croup. The tail is long and carried low, with an upward curve at the end.

Temperament

The Sloughi is a primitive hunting breed that bonds extremely closely with its owner or family from an early age. They are unlikely to be exceedingly shy or aggressive. A well bred and well socialized Sloughi is a stable, attentive, and exceedingly loving family member.

The American Sloughi Association standard states that, “The Sloughi is a dog with class and grace. The attitude is noble and somewhat aloof.”

Because of their origins as the hunters and guardians of Sahara nomads and bedouins, the Sloughi is reserved with strangers and takes a while to warm up to new friends. The Sloughi also expects reserve from people they meet, and may not appreciate those who are too familiar. The Sloughi is also noted for its primitive instincts, for unlike other sighthound breeds it is highly alert and territorial which made them prized by the Berbers, not only as hunters, but as fearless watch dogs.

Improperly socialized Sloughis can be shy and or aggressive towards other dogs, and it is critical that breeders consider temperament in their breeding decisions and that puppies receive appropriate socialization from an early age so that they mature into well adjusted adults. Their socialization must include not only new people, but new situations, environments and other dogs.

Sloughis that are accustomed to children are excellent with children. As with all breeds, children need to be taught to respect dogs and not to mistreat them.

They require ample daily exercise in order to meet their physical, emotional and mental needs. This is not a breed that is well suited to apartment life without a planned regimen of daily exercise that includes galloping freely.

Sloughis have been bred for millennia to course game and as a result have extremely high prey drive. They can be wonderful with cats, small dogs and other animals if they are introduced at an early age and learn that these other pets are not prey.

The Sloughi's character is also tender and intelligent and they are sensitive to correction. They must be trained with methods that are also intelligent and sensitive. Heavy-handed or corporal training methods are not effective for any breed, but they are especially deleterious to the character of sighthounds.

Health
Only a few genetic conditions have been confirmed in the breed. These include certain autoimmune disorders, such as Addison's disease and irritable bowel syndrome and progressive retinal atrophy. The Sloughi is one of the breeds for whom a genetic test for progressive retinal atrophy has been developed to with a simple blood test.  Like all sighthounds, the Sloughi is very sensitive to anesthesia, and can be sensitive to vaccines, worming, and other medications—so these routine treatments should be spaced apart instead of given all at once. The breed tends to enjoy excellent health into old age.

See also
 Dogs portal
 List of dog breeds

References

External links
 American Sloughi Association, AKC National Parent Club for the Sloughi
 Sloughi in Europe
 Sloughi Pedigree Database

FCI breeds
Sighthounds
Dog breeds originating in Africa
Rare dog breeds